Angel Octavio Alvarez (born November 15, 1997) is an American soccer player.

Career

College
Alvarez played two years of college soccer, spending one year at Lakeland Community College before transferring to the Laramie County Community College in 2017.

Professional
In March 2018, Alvarez signed with USL side Las Vegas Lights FC ahead of their inaugural 2018 season.

References

External links 
 

1997 births
Living people
American soccer players
Association football goalkeepers
Lakeland Community College alumni
Las Vegas Lights FC players
Soccer players from Las Vegas
Sportspeople from Las Vegas
USL Championship players